Kreissparkasse Ludwigsburg is a savings bank with seat in Ludwigsburg.

History and Briefing 
It was founded in 1852. It has 1,460 employees at 101 locations in the district of Ludwigsburg and total assets of 11.82 Billion Euros. It provides financial services to small-scale businesses and retail banking customers.

External links
 Official Website

Banks of Germany
Banks established in 1852
1852 establishments in Germany
19th-century establishments in Württemberg